Sidewire was a political news analysis platform available for the iOS marketplace. It was founded in 2012 by Andy Bromberg and Tucker Bounds, former spokesperson for the 2008 presidential campaign of John McCain. The app was launched at the beginning of the 2016 election cycle, originally billed as "Twitter for politics." Sidewire failed to build a substantial user base, and by June 2017 Sidewire ran out of investment and ceased operations.

History

Sidewire was founded in 2012 by Andy Bromberg and Tucker Bounds. It was started with $4.85 million in Seed Funding from Spark Capital, with participation from Goldcrest Capital. The platform was launched in September 2015 as an app in the iOS marketplace. In June 2017, having burned through their Seed Funding and unable to secure further investment, Sidewire ceased operations.

Platform

Sideline was curated by political journalist, analysts, candidates, campaign managers, and elected officials. Curators are responsible for uploading links to news and then providing a 250 character summary. The information is then pushed to the Sideline platform and also Twitter, Facebook, and LinkedIn. Initial curators have included analysts and journalists from The Wall Street Journal, the New York Times, The Washington Post, ABC, and NBC.

Former contributors
A partial list of former contributors to the platform

 Daniel Pfeiffer

References

External links 
 Official website

American news websites
Companies established in 2012